Maibella is a town located in the east side of Charaideo district, Assam (India). The town is home to APGCL (ASEB) which is a major electricity production unit in the whole North Eastern Region. Currently APGCL has three Power houses and one new Power house is under construction under BHEL ( Bharat Heavy Electricals Limited ) http://www.bhel.com/home.php

Sivasagar district